Senate of the Republic may refer to:
Senate of the Republic, the Senate of the Italian Republic
Senate of the Republic, the Senate of the United Mexican States
Senate of the Republic, the Senate of the Republic of Türkiye

See also
Assembly of the Republic (disambiguation)